Mindi is a suburb in Andhra Pradesh, India.
Mindi may also refer to:

Mindi Abair (born 1969), American jazz saxophonist
Mindi Jackson (born 1978?), lead singer of the Australian pop band Rogue Traders
Mindi or Mirndi languages, spoken in Australia

See also
Emperor Min (disambiguation), the posthumous name for several imperial Chinese emperors
Mindy (disambiguation)
Minde (disambiguation)

English feminine given names
English given names